Robert J. LaFortune (born January 24, 1927) is a Republican politician from the U.S. state of Oklahoma. LaFortune was mayor of Tulsa, Oklahoma from 1970 to 1978.

Early life
LaFortune was born and raised in Tulsa. His parents, Joseph Aloysius LaFortune and Gertrude Leona Tremel LaFortune, who had moved there in 1920 from South Bend, Indiana. Joseph, a graduate of the University of Notre Dame, worked for thirty years at Warren Petroleum Company, becoming executive vice president and a noted local philanthropist. Robert LaFortune graduated from Cascia Hall Preparatory School in 1944. He served in the United States Merchant Marine Cadet Corps for two years. After receiving his discharge, he attended the University of Tulsa and then transferred to Purdue University, where he graduated with a Bachelor of Science degree in chemical engineering in 1951. He then joined Reilly Tar and Chemical Company, where he worked for five years. He then became a part owner of Reed Drilling Company.

Public sector
Robert left private business to serve three terms as Tulsa's commissioner of streets and public property from 1964 to 1970.  LaFortune was elected Mayor of Tulsa in 1970, an office he held until 1978. As commissioner, he was active in developing the Tulsa Port of Catoosa. Specifically, he secured acquisition of the  site and obtained approval of development funding for the port. As mayor, he got passage of bond issues for the city's freeway system, as well as the Williams Center and Tulsa Performing Arts Center in downtown Tulsa. He also helped initiate the start of the Indian Nations Council of Governments (INCOG).

Awards and honors
He is or has been a director of Apco Argentina Inc., BOK Financial Corporation and the Williams Companies. LaFortune is a member of the National Executive Board of the Boy Scouts of America, the organization's governing body.

He was a 1982 recipient of the Silver Buffalo Award from the Boy Scouts of America, and in 1995 the University of Tulsa granted him an honorary doctor of laws degree. He is the uncle of Bill LaFortune, who served as Mayor of Tulsa (2002–2006).

In 2017, a portrait of LaFortune was unveiled at the Tulsa Performing Arts Center (PAC). The portrait was made by Nathan Opp, professor of art at Oral Roberts University. LaFortune was mayor when the PAC was first planned, and participated in forming the public-private partnership that funded construction of the PAC.

On October 16, 1960, LaFortune Park was opened to the public. As the first county park in Oklahoma, the 270-acres features over 700 trees, 11 ponds, and more than 100,000 visitors a year. There is an 18-hole championship golf course, a lighted driving range, pro shop and the only lighted 18-hole par 3 in Oklahoma. It’s a spectacular setting for all occasions with indoor and outdoor event spaces. The park was originally not called LaFortune Park, but was renamed in honor of the Tulsa mayor.

Personal life
Jeanne Morse LaFortune, Robert's wife, died November 15, 2003. Born August 25, 1929, she was a native of Missouri. She and Robert married in 1951. They had six children, three sons and three daughters, and 16 grandchildren, all of whom survived her.

LaFortune's grandson, G. T. Bynum, is mayor of Tulsa.

References

External links
Voices of Oklahoma interview with Robert J. LaFortune. First person interview conducted on March 5, 2013, with Robert J. LaFortune.

Living people
Mayors of Tulsa, Oklahoma
Purdue University College of Engineering alumni
1927 births
National Executive Board of the Boy Scouts of America members
20th-century American philanthropists
20th-century American politicians
Philanthropists from Oklahoma